Cecil Roth (5 March 1899 – 21 June 1970) was a British Jewish historian.
He was editor in chief of Encyclopaedia Judaica.

Life
Roth was born in Dalston, London, on 5 March 1899. His parents were Etty and Joseph Roth, and Cecil was the youngest of their four sons. In childhood, Cecil received a traditional Jewish religious education, including studying Hebrew, with Jacob Mann. He went to school at City of London School. He fought in the First World War, seeing active duty in France in 1918.

At University, Roth studied history at Merton College, Oxford. He took a first-class BA in modern history in 1922, and a D.Phil. in  1924. His first published work, based on his thesis, was The Last Florentine Republic (1527-1530), published in 1925. Roth was elected a Fellow of the Royal Historical Society in the same year and a Fellow of the Royal Society of Literature in 1941.

In 1928 he married Irene Rosalind Davis and lived off freelance writing until returning to Oxford as Reader in Post-Biblical Jewish Studies from 1939 to 1964.

The couple were enthusiastic collectors of Judaism-related manuscripts and objets d'art, selling substantial collections of the former to the Brotherton Library of the University of Leeds in 1961, and of the latter to the Beth Tzedec Synagogue Museum in Toronto.

On his retirement from Oxford in 1964, at the invitation of Joseph H. Lookstein, Roth became a visiting professor at Bar-Ilan University, Israel, moving to Jerusalem. However, within a month of his arrival he was attacked in a publication by Rabbi Avraham Yitzhak Bromberg for allegedly arguing that Moses never existed — when in fact he had noted others' scepticism about Moses' existence and argued that Moses had in fact lived. The accusation prompted a scandal, and Roth suffered a heart attack in November 1964. Roth's wife Irene attributed the heart attack partly to stress of migrating, and partly to the stress of the accusations. Roth stood down from his position at the University early in 1965, citing ill health. He went on to hold a position at the City University of New York (1966–1969) while working as general editor of the Encyclopaedia Judaica, dying in post shortly after the first edition of the encyclopaedia was completed.

Roth died, aged 71, on 21 June 1970 in Jerusalem.

Works 

He was editor in chief of Encyclopaedia Judaica from 1965 until his death.

His works number over 600 items, including: 
 The Last Florentine Republic (1527-1530)  (London, 1925)
 
 Life of Menasseh Ben Israel (Philadelphia, 1934)
 Roth Haggadah (1934)
 A short History of the Jewish people (Macmillan, London 1936)
 Magna Bibliotheca Anglo-Judaica: a Bibliographical Guide to Anglo-Jewish History (London, 1937)
 The Spanish Inquisition  (Robert Hale Limited 1937)
 Anglo-Jewish Letters, 1158-1917 (London, 1938)
 History of the Great Synagogue (of London), available online, as part of the at the Susser Archive of JCR-UK
 The Jewish Contribution to Civilization (New York 1941)
 History of the Jews in England (Oxford, 1941)
 History of the Jews in Italy (Philadelphia, 1946)
 The Rise of Provincial Jewry (Oxford, 1950), available online, as part of the Susser Archive of JCR-UK
 History of the Jews (initially published as A Bird's-Eye View of Jewish History) (1954)
 The Jews in the Renaissance (Philadelphia, 1959)
 Jewish Art (1961)
 The Dead Sea Scrolls (1965)

Biography
 Irene Roth, Cecil Roth: Historian without Tears. A Memoir (New York: Sepher-Hermon Press, 1982),

References

External links
 Encyclopaedia Judaica (2007) entry on "Roth, Cecil" by Vivian D. Lipman
 Cecil Roth Collection, University of Leeds

English Jews
Jewish historians
1899 births
1970 deaths
Alumni of Merton College, Oxford
20th-century British historians
Contributors to the Jewish Encyclopedia
British military personnel of World War I
Fellows of the Royal Historical Society
Fellows of the Royal Society of Literature
Academics of the University of Oxford
Academic staff of Bar-Ilan University
City University of New York faculty